Bruges is a city in Belgium.

Bruges may also refer to:

Places
Bruges, Gironde, France
Bruges, Pyrénées-Atlantiques, France

Other uses
Grafen Bruges-von Pfuel, German Uradel ("ancient nobility")
 In Bruges (2008), black comedy crime film
 SS Bruges, a Belgian cargo ship sunk by a German auxiliary cruiser in the South Atlantic in July 1940
 SS Bruges (1920), passenger ship bombed and damaged on 11 June 1940 at Le Havre by Luftwaffe aircraft

See also
 Bruges speech
 Bruges Group (disambiguation)
 Burges (disambiguation)